Randerson is a surname, and may refer to

 Anthony Randerson, New Zealand Chief High Court Judge
Glenda Randerson (born 1949), New Zealand painter
 Jenny Randerson (born 1948), Welsh Liberal Democrat member of the House of Lords
 Richard Randerson (born 1940), Dean of Holy Trinity Cathedral, Auckland